Long Bay Regional Park is a regional park in Long Bay located in Auckland, New Zealand. It is located in the Hibiscus and Bays in the northern part of the city and is operated by Auckland Council.

Geography 

The cliffs of the park are formed by Waitemata Group sandstone. The northern section of the park features large pōhutukawa and regenerating native bush. The regional park is adjacent to the Long Bay-Okura Marine Reserve, a 980-hectare reserve extending from Karepiro Bay to Torbay.

History 

Areas of farmland above Long Bay Regional Park were protected from development by a court ruling in July 2008.

References 

Hibiscus and Bays Local Board Area
Parks in the Auckland Region
Regional parks of New Zealand
Tourist attractions in the Auckland Region